Rhombopora is an extinct genus of bryozoa. It existed from the Ordovician to Permian period (457.50 - 252.17 million years ago).

Species

References

Stenolaemata genera
Prehistoric bryozoan genera
Rhabdomesida
Fossil taxa described in 1872
Extinct bryozoans